Euclea nanina, the nanina oak-slug moth, is a species of slug caterpillar moth in the family Limacodidae.

The MONA or Hodges number for Euclea nanina is 4697.1.

References

Further reading

 

Limacodidae
Articles created by Qbugbot
Moths described in 1899
Taxa named by Harrison Gray Dyar Jr.